Gotthilf is a male given name. Notable people with this name include:

Gotthilf Christoph Wilhelm Busolt (1771–1831), German scholar
Gotthilf Fischer (1928–2020), German choir and orchestra director
Gotthilf Hagen (1797–1884), German physicist
Arnold Ludwig Gotthilf Heller (1840–1913), German anatomist and pathologist
Gotthilf Hempel (born 1929), German marine biologist
Gotthilf August von Maltitz (1794–1837), German writer
Gotthilf Ludwig Möckel (1838–1915), German architect
Daniel Gotthilf Moldenhawer (1753–1823), Danish academic
Gotthilf Heinrich Ernst Muhlenberg (1753–1815), American botanist and clergyman
Friedrich Gotthilf Osann (1794–1858), German philologist
Christian Gotthilf Salzmann (1744–1811), German academic
Gotthilf Heinrich von Schubert (1780–1860), German scientist
Gotthilf Weisstein (1852–1907), German journalist
Johann Gotthilf Ziegler (1688–1747), German composer

See also